Dhiraar ibn al-Khattab was a warrior participating in the early Islamic conquests. Dhiraar's father, al-Khattab bin Mirdas bin Kathir, was the head of the Banu Fihr clan of Quraish subclan are found throughout his works. Khattab bin Mirdas has lineage through their grandfather, Fihr ibn Malik, with the Prophet. His mother was Hind bint Malik Umm Dhiraar bint Amr, and His uncle was Hafs bin Mirdas.

Biography 
Dhiraar bin al-Khattab was born in Mecca. As his father was a respected head of Banu Fihr clan, Dhiraar was trained as a brave warrior and known as a skilled poet. Ibn 'Abd al-Barr said he was also well known for his skill in Equestrianism.

Dhiraar participated during the Battle of Uhud, where he served under Khalid ibn Walid riders, ambushing the Muslim archers on the mount of Uhud. He is recorded, in his own words, that he successfully killed 11 Muslims. Some of those who he had killed were Ansar fighters: Amr bin Muadh al-Nu'man, 'Amr bin Thabit bin Waqqas, Sayf bin Qayz, Iyas bin Aws bin Atik.

During the Battle of Khandaq, when the Qurayshite under Abu Sufyan ibn Harb led the campaign against Muslims in Medina, Dhiraar was one of the small band riders of the allied army that was able to jump over the trenches, along with Amr ibn Abd al-Wud, Ikrimah ibn Abi Jahl, Nawfal ibn Abdullah Ibn Mughirah al-Makhzumi and Hubayrah bin Abi Wahb al-Makhzumi, which prompted two Muslim warriors, Zubayr ibn al-Awwam and Umar ibn al-Khattab chasing those horsemens and fight them. Zubayr managed to slay Ibn Mughirah, and forcing Ikrima to flee from the battlefield, while Amr ibn Abd al-Wud has been slain by Ali ibn Abi Talib. in a duel. On the other hand, Dhiraar managed to overcame Umar. However, Dhiraar decided to spare Umar life as he said he did not want to kill a fellow Quraishite kinsmen in this battle.

Dhirrar became Muslim on the day of the conquest of Mecca.

Dhiraar fought in the Ridda wars when the Caliphate under Abu Bakr was hit by rebellions across Arab, where Dhiraar participated in the Battle of Yamama under Khalid ibn al-Walid.

During of Khalid ibn al-Walid  campaign in the Muslim conquest of Iraq, he formed Ummal, a military units that act as his deputy personnel to govern, watch, and collect Kharaj and Jizya in the occupied areas, or as raiding parties in uncaptured cities or settlements. At one time, Khalid appointed Dhiraar ibn al-Azwar, Al-Qa'qa' ibn Amr al-Tamimi, Dhiraar ibn al-Khattab, al-Muthanna ibn Haritha, Dhiraar ibn Muqrin, and Busr ibn Abi Ruhm as Ummal raiding force to raid Sib, a district located near the city of Qasr ibn Hubayrah and north of Hillah. These raiding detachment forces made repeated, casual raids until it was subdued.

Later, during Muslim conquest of the Levant, Dhiraar fought in the Battle of Yarmouk under Abu Ubayda ibn al-Jarrah.

Dhiraar fought in the Battle of Qadisiyyah under Sa'd ibn Abi Waqqas. In the third day of the battle which called the day of Imash when the Sassanid elephant corps going rampage towards the Rashidun ranks, the Rashidun top commanders brought themselves to personally engage the elehpants. Amr ibn Ma'adi Yakrib were the one who instructed the Rashidun soldiers to sever the trunks of the elephants, which done so by the soldiers around him and stopped their advance. Historical narratives from poets recited during this battle revealed that Amr were the first to realize the elephants of Sassanid armies has paralyzed the horses of Rashidun, as the mounts did not used being close with such animals. Then Dhiraar ibn al-Khattab charged along with Khalid ibn Urfuta, Jarir ibn Abdullah Al-Bajali, Al-Qa'qa' ibn Amr al-Tamimi, Tulayha, Amr ibn Ma'adi Yakrib and Dhiraar ibn al-Azwar to turn and engage against the elephant corps, aiming their weapons to pierced the elephants eyes, while also aimed to kill the elephant riders. 

Later, Dhiraar fought in the Battle of Jalula under Hashim ibn Utba.

This force immediately engaged Hormuzan and successfully defeat the Persian in Masabzan, while capturing one of the Persian commander. Sa'd in turn then placing Dhiraar as administrator in Masabzan area.

After the Battle of Nahavand caliph Umar sent Dhiraar to defeat Sassanid army in an area called Masabdhan.

Quotes 
Sometime after Dhiraar embraced Islam, he met some people from Aus and Khazraj arguing over who of the two tribes was the bravest during the battle of Uhud. Aus and Khazraj are two Ansar tribes. When they saw Dhirar crossing, they asked him. Dhirar, who had become a good Muslim, said:

"I don't know who among you are from the Aus or Khazraj Tribe, but what is clear, when that battle(Uhud) broke out, I managed to marry 11 of you to the maidens of heaven."

This means, Dhiraar who was still a polytheist at that battle time, had killed 11 Muslims. Since due to Islamic belief, if a Muslim goes to war and is killed by infidels, they certainly go straight to heaven without judgment.

See also 
 Battle of al-Qādisiyyah
 Battle of Yarmouk
 Dhiraar bin Al-Azwar

References 

 

Quraysh
Year of birth missing
Year of death missing
7th-century Arabs
People from Mecca
People from the Rashidun Caliphate
People of the Muslim conquest of Persia